Percussion Explosion is the only studio album by short lived and revolutionary Miami, Florida group  Herman Kelly & Life.

Track listing
Dance To The Drummer's Beat	5:09	
Time After Time	4:38	
A Refreshing Love	6:40	
Who's The Funky D.J. ?	8:34	
Share Your Love	3:30	
Do The Handbone	3:40

Charts

Singles

External links
 Herman Kelly &Life-Percussion Explosion at Discogs

References

1978 debut albums